Papoose Creek is a stream in Washington County in the U.S. state of Missouri. It is a tributary of Little Indian Creek.

Papoose Creek was so named due to its diminutive size, which was likened to a papoose.

See also
List of rivers of Missouri

References

Rivers of Washington County, Missouri
Rivers of Missouri